Waltz for Koop is the second studio album by the Swedish electronic music duo Koop. It was their first album to hit a U.S. Billboard chart, peaking at number seventeen on Top Electronic Albums. The compositions are recorded and mixed by Mats "Limpan" Lindfors. Two years after its release, a remix album was issued with the title Waltz for Koop: Alternative Takes.

Track listing

Credits
Bass – Dan Berglund (tracks: 1 2 4 5 6 7 8 9)
Bongos – Ola Bothzén
Engineer (co-engineered) – Limpan
Flute, brass (reeds) – Magnus Lindgren
Mastered by – Bo Kondren
Producer, written by – Magnus Zingmark, Oscar Simonsson
Recorded by, mixed by – Koop
Vibraphone – Mattias Ståhl

Sales

|}

Legacy 
 "Summer Sun" is featured during a ballroom dance segment in the 2004 animated teen sitcom O'Grady.

 "Waltz for Koop" was featured in the theatrical trailer for the 2005 film Match Point.

References

2001 albums
Koop (band) albums
2003 remix albums